Limlu may refer to:
 Limlu, Ardabil
 Limlu, East Azerbaijan